Faculty of Architecture and Planning, Dr. A.P.J. Abdul Kalam Technical University also known as Government College of Architecture (GCA) or Lucknow College of Architecture (LCA), Lucknow, is a state funded college in Uttar Pradesh.

It started with Government College of Arts & Crafts in 1911 but the architecture college separated from it in 1976 and named Government School of Architecture. It was renamed in 1980  as Government College of Architecture. In 2000 it was renamed as Faculty of Architecture and later renamed as Faculty of Architecture and Planning.
It imparts a 5-year Bachelor of Architecture degree course and is affiliated to Dr. A.P.J. Abdul Kalam Technical University (formerly Uttar Pradesh Technical University), Lucknow.

See also
College of Arts and Crafts, Lucknow
Dr. A.P.J. Abdul Kalam Technical University
Institute of Engineering and Technology
List of colleges affiliated with Uttar Pradesh Technical University
Architecture

External links
 Official website

Universities and colleges in Lucknow
Dr. A.P.J. Abdul Kalam Technical University
Architecture schools in India
Educational institutions established in 1976
1976 establishments in Uttar Pradesh